Photoautotrophs are organisms that use light energy and inorganic carbon to produce organic materials. Eukaryotic photoautotrophs absorb energy through the chlorophyll molecules in their chloroplasts while prokaryotic photoautotrophs use chlorophylls and bacteriochlorophylls present in their cytoplasm. All known photoautotrophs perform photosynthesis. Examples include plants, algae, and cyanobacteria.

Origin and the Great Oxidation Event 
Chemical and geological evidence indicate that photosynthetic cyanobacteria existed about 2.6 billion years ago and anoxygenic photosynthesis had been taking place since a billion years before that. Oxygenic photosynthesis was the primary source of oxygenation and led to the Great Oxidation Event (the Oxygen Catastrophe) roughly 2.4 to 2.1 billion years ago. Although the end of the Great Oxidation Event was marked by a significant decrease in gross primary productivity that eclipsed extinction events, the development of aerobic respiration enabled energy extraction from organic molecules, allowing multi-cellular growth and diversification of life on Earth.

Prokaryotic photoautotrophs 
Prokaryotic photoautotrophs include Cyanobacteria, Pseudomonadota, Chloroflexota, Acidobacteriota, Chlorobiota, Bacillota, Gemmatimonadota, and Eremiobacterota.

Cyanobacteria is the only prokaryotic group that performs oxygenic photosynthesis. Anoxygenic photosynthetic bacteria use PSI- and PSII-like photosystems, which are pigment protein complexes for capturing light. Both of these photosystems use bacteriochlorophyll. There are multiple hypotheses for how oxygenic photosynthesis evolved. The loss hypothesis states that PSI and PSII were present in anoxygenic ancestor cyanobacteria from which the different branches of anoxygenic bacteria evolved. The fusion hypothesis states that the photosystems merged later through horizontal gene transfer. The most recent hypothesis suggests that PSI and PSII diverged from an unknown common ancestor with a protein complex that was coded by one gene. These photosystems then specialized into the ones that are found today.

Eukaryotic photoautotrophs 
Eukaryotic photoautotrophs include red algae, haptophytes, stramenopiles, cryptophytes, chlorophytes, and land plants. These organisms perform photosynthesis through organelles called chloroplasts and are believed to have originated about 2 billion years ago. Comparing the genes of chloroplast and cyanobacteria strongly suggests that chloroplasts evolved as a result of endosymbiosis with cyanobacteria that gradually lost the genes required to be free-living. However, it is difficult to determine whether all chloroplasts originated from a single, primary endosymbiotic event, or multiple independent events. Some brachiopods (Gigantoproductus) and bivalves (Tridacna) also evolved photoautotrophy.

References 

Trophic ecology
Biology terminology
Photosynthesis